The Soboleva modified hyperbolic tangent, also known as (parametric) Soboleva modified hyperbolic tangent activation function ([P]SMHTAF), is a special S-shaped function based on the hyperbolic tangent, given by

This function was originally proposed as "modified hyperbolic tangent" by Elena V. Soboleva as a utility function for multi-objective optimization and choice modelling in decision-making. It has since been introduced into neural network theory and practice.

The function was also used to approximate current-voltage characteristics of field-effect transistors and light-emitting diodes, to design antenna feeders, and analyze plasma temperatures and densities in the divertor region of fusion reactors.

A family of recurrence-generated parametric Soboleva modified hyperbolic tangent activation functions (NPSMHTAF, FPSMHTAF) was studied with parameters a = c and b = d.

With parameters a = b = c = d = 1 the modified hyperbolic tangent function reduces to the conventional tanh(x) function, whereas for a = b = 1 and c = d = 0, the term becomes equal to sinh(x).

See also
 Activation function
 e (mathematical constant)
 Equal incircles theorem, based on sinh
 Hausdorff distance
 Inverse hyperbolic functions
 List of integrals of hyperbolic functions
 Poinsot's spirals
 Sigmoid function

Notes

References

Further reading
  (20 pages) 

Elementary special functions
Exponentials
Analytic functions
Functions and mappings
Artificial neural networks